Jacinto Júnior Conceição Cabral (born 10 March 1992), commonly known as Juninho Cabral or just Juninho, is a Brazilian professional footballer who plays for Erovnuli Liga side FC Shukura Kobuleti, where he plays as a forward.

Playing career

SK Brann
Together with his friend and compatriot Diego, he was brought to Norwegian club SK Brann in the summer of 2010 after previously having been on trial with the club. He made his debut for the first team of 30 August 2010. Despite failing to make an impact in his first year for Brann, manager Rune Skarsfjord said he wanted to extend Juninho's loan for another six months. On 26 January 2011, Brann did sign Juninho on a six-month loan with an option to purchase the player after the time.

FK Fyllingsdalen
The loan spell ended in 2011. In 2012, he joined another club from Bergen in Norway, FK Fyllingsdalen. He became the only professional full-time footballer in the third-tier club. He made his debut as a substitute on 12 May 2012. In 2013, he joined Araxá Esporte Clube.

Senglea Athletic
Juninho Carbal re-signed for Maltese Premier League side Senglea Athletic on a six-month deal on 14 January 2020.

FC Shukura Kobuleti
Juninho left Maltese First Division side Marsaxlokk to sign for Erovnuli Liga side FC Shukura Kobuleti on 13 January 2021.

References

1992 births
Living people
Brazilian footballers
Desportivo Brasil players
SK Brann players
Clube Esportivo Naviraiense players
Botafogo Futebol Clube (PB) players
Floriana F.C. players
Senglea Athletic F.C. players
FK Rabotnički players
Marsaxlokk F.C. players
FC Shukura Kobuleti players
Brazilian expatriate footballers
Expatriate footballers in Norway
Brazilian expatriate sportspeople in Norway
Eliteserien players
Association football forwards